Wang Guangyi (born 1957) is a Chinese artist. He is known as a leader of the new art movement that started in China after 1989, and for his Great Criticism series of paintings, which use images of propaganda from the Cultural Revolution (1966–1976) and contemporary brand names from western advertising.

Life
Wang Guangyi was born in Harbin, Heilongjiang Province in 1957. Wang's father was a railway worker in northeastern China. Like many other people, Wang experienced the influence of the Cultural Revolution and had to work in a rural village for three years. He too became a railway worker. Wang tried for four years to get into a college. After several failed attempts, he enrolled at Zhejiang Academy of Fine Arts. He graduated from the oil painting department of the academy in 1984. He lives and works in Beijing, China.

Artwork

His work is considered in China to be in the Political Pop genre; some consider this an error.

Early works – Mid-1980s
The North Pole is a recurring theme in Wang Guangyi's early works; it is seen not in relation to its geographic characteristics, but as a symbolic place where a new faith is born, in which the individual must deal principally with himself, but without freeing himself from the social. Working on the Frozen North Pole cycle (1984-1985), the group of young Artists of the North, of which Wang Guangyi was a part, chose to confront themselves with Western philosophy.
In his Post Classical series (1986-1988) Wang Guangyi worked on a synthetic revision of the great works of Western art tied to themes of religion, morality, faith and ideology. These paintings use various grey tones and encapsulate the human figure and its environment without many details. Wang Guangyi's objective consisted in elaborating a style that deviated from that of classic art, an expressive strategy which derived from his reading of Gombrich.

Great Criticism, 1990-2007
Great Criticism is Wang Guangyi's most famous cycle of works. These works use propaganda images of the Cultural Revolution and contemporary logos from Western advertisements. Wang Guangyi began this cycle in 1990 and ended it in 2007 when he became convinced that its international success would compromise the original meaning of the works, namely that political and commercial propaganda are two forms of brainwashing.

1990s
The series and installations VISA (1995-1998), Passport (1994-1995), and Virus Carriers (1996-1998) contain images of infants, grown adults and dogs accompanied by their respective names, places, dates of birth and genders. The aforementioned titles of these works are then imprinted upon these images. By forefronting the bureaucratic procedures tied to moving from one country to another, these works reveal that the organization of the State enacts its own defenses when evaluating the potential danger of individuals.
Wang Guangyi perceives a well-established climate of reciprocal suspicion and looming danger, which ripened during the Cold War and still persists today, even if it has lost the oppressiveness born of forced indoctrination. Wang Guangyi's reflection deals with the relationship that Power has with the individual, on which it maintains control by increasing collective fears to then propose itself as a bastion against unknown dangers that could suddenly strike against defenseless people. The artist maintains that through these forms of psychological pressure, a tacit agreement that provides protection against the contagion of new viruses in exchange for the renouncement of a part of one's freedom is forged between the Power and the individual.

2000s
During the 2000s the relationship between Wang Guangyi's works and the transcendent increased. In fact the title given to the Materialist series (2001-2005) is not contradictory. This series of sculptures made from the images of twelve workers, farmers and soldiers that were taken from propaganda images. According to Wang Guangyi these propaganda images bring to light that the main force of the people, the anger expressed by their movements, derives from faith in ideology. With these sculptures the artist attempts to put an image to the general feeling of the people while referencing dialectic materialism - Materialist is a term that has particular import in Chinese history in that it summarizes the socialist ideology. At the same time, the artist also sees another level of meaning within the work. In art, things that possess certain conceptual qualities are called “the object”, which in Chinese has the same root as the word “materialist”, 
Wang Guangyi has also represented the great political (Lenin, Stalin, Mao), spiritual (Christ) and spiritual and political leaders (John XXIII), as well as the philosophers whose thought continues to exert its influence today (Marx and Engels) in series of oil paintings entitled New Religion (2011). The images seem taken from photographic negatives, and though the artist uses a traditional oil painting technique in these works, the ambiguity created by the reference to photography breaks the familiarity that the spectator has with them, thereby opening up interpretations as to their meaning. Through this cycle of works Wang Guangyi has asked himself about the commonalities between the great utopias, the fascination that they exert on humans, and why all men feel the need to find figures on which to place their faith. The installations that make up the cycle Cold War Aesthetics (2007-2008) contain historical reconstructions of the Cold War period. In these works, Wang Guangyi deals with the psychological effects of the propaganda that was characteristic of the Chinese political climate of that time. In order to evoke a psychological reaction, the artist makes the spectators feel the emotion, climate and mentality of that era.

Criticism
Wang Guangyi, like others such as Fang Lijun, has become a millionaire, one of China's nouveau riches. Such painters, with their large studios and expensive houses and cars, are in China called bopu dashi or "pop masters". Wang Guangyi's successful career and fast growing wealth have drawn criticism. Some have questioned his artistic value, along with the price of his works. Some critics claim that Wang "has lost his artistic ingenuity, gives in to the market, and has also become dependent on repeating his already successful works".

Solo exhibitions
Wang Guangyi has had a number of solo exhibitions, including:
 1993: Galerie Bellefroid, Paris, France
 1994: Hanart TZ Gallery, Hong Kong
 1997: Galerie Klaus Littmann, Basel, Switzerland
 2001: Faces of Faith, Soobin Art Gallery, Singapore
 2003: Gallery Enrico Navarra, Paris, France
 2004: Galerie Urs Meile, Lucerne, Switzerland
 2006: Arario Gallery, Seoul, Korea
 2007: Galerie Thaddaeus Ropac, Paris, France
 2008: Visual Politics, He Xiangning Art Museum, Shenzhen, China
 2008: Cold War Aesthetics, Louise Blouin Institute, London
 2011: The Interactive Mirror Image, Tank Loft, Chongqing Contemporary Art Center, Chongqing, China
 2012: Thing-In-Itself: Utopia, Pop and Personal Theology, Today Art Museum, Beijing, China 
 2012: Cold War Aesthetics, Pujiang Oversea Chinese Town, Shanghai, China

References

Further reading
 Karen Smith. Guangyi, 2003
 David Spalding. The Paintings of Wang Guangyi: Revolutionary Acts? January, 2006
 Mary Bittner Wiseman (2007). Subversive Strategies in Chinese Avant-Garde Art. The Journal of Aesthetics and Art Criticism 65 (1, Special Issue: Global Theories of the Arts and Aesthetics; Winter, 2007): p. 109–119 
 Demetrio Paparoni. Wang Guanyi: Works and Thoughts 1985-2012. Milan: Skira, 2013

Living people
Painters from Heilongjiang
1957 births
Artists from Harbin
Chinese contemporary artists